The 2018 Women's World University Handball Championship was the 12th edition of this Handball event organized by the FISU. It was held in Rijeka, Croatia at the Zamet Hall, from 30 July to 5 August.

Participating teams

Group stage

Group A

Group B

Classification round

Knockout stage

First to fourth place classification

Semifinals

Third place game

Final

Final standing

Top scorers

References

External links
WUC Handball 2018 web site

Handball-Women's
University handball championship
World University Handball Championship
World University Handball Championship
World University Handball Championship